Life on a String is a 1991 Chinese film by acclaimed film director Chen Kaige. Made before his international breakthrough Farewell, My Concubine, Life on a String is a more intimate and philosophical affair, telling the story of a blind sanxian player and his young disciple. The film was based on the novel Life on a String (《命若琴弦》) by Shi Tiesheng.  The film was entered into the 1991 Cannes Film Festival.

Cast 
Liu Zhongyuan as the Old Master, a master blind sanxian player, as a child he was told that upon wearing out his 1000th string, his sight would be restored.
Huang Lei as Shitou, his young disciple. 
Xu Qing as Lanxiu

References

External links

Life on a String at the Chinese Movie Database

1991 films
1991 drama films
Films based on Chinese novels
Films about blind people
Films directed by Chen Kaige
1990s Mandarin-language films

Chinese drama films